Open & Close is an album by Nigerian Afrobeat composer, bandleader, and multi-instrumentalist Fela Kuti, recorded in Lagos in 1971 and originally released on the Nigerian His Master's Voice label.

Reception

AllMusic commented: "Perhaps the distinguishing factors of records like Open & Close and some of Fela's other '70s releases are that as much as he liked to ride a groove, he also liked to disrupt it, twist it and turn it, reshape it, only to bring it back to its original shape. There was less of that later in his career".

Track listing
All compositions by Fela Kuti 
 "Open and Close" – 15:02
 "Swegbe and Pako (Part 1)" – 5:41
 "Swegbe and Pako (Part 2)" – 6:45
 "Gbagada Gbogodo" – 9:17

Personnel
Fela Kuti – tenor saxophone, alto saxophone, electric piano, vocals
Tony Njoku – trumpet
Igo Chico – tenor saxophone
Lekan Animashaun – baritone saxophone
Ohiri Akigbe, Tutu Sorunmu – guitar
Ayo Azenabor – bass guitar
Tony Allen – drums
James Abayomi – percussion
Isiak Olaleye – shekere
Henry Koffi, Akwesi Korrantin, Tony Kupoliyi – congas

References

Fela Kuti albums
1971 albums
Afrobeat albums
EMI Records albums